Sacred Heart of Jesus School may refer to:

 Sacred Heart of Jesus School (New York City) 
 Sacred Heart of Jesus School (Du Quoin), Illinois, United States